Andrian Zbîrnea (born 12 May 1990) is a Moldovan male weightlifter, competing in the 105 kg category and representing Moldova at international competitions. He competed at world championships, most recently at the 2014 World Weightlifting Championships. At the 2015 European Weightlifting Championships Zbîrnea won the silver medal in overall ranking.

In June 2015 the International Weightlifting Federation (IWF) has suspended Adrian Zbîrnea in view of a potential anti-doping rule violation, after he returned a positive A sample for anabolic agents.

Major results

References

External links
 
 

1990 births
Living people
Moldovan male weightlifters
Place of birth missing (living people)
Doping cases in weightlifting
Moldovan sportspeople in doping cases